This article attempts to list the oldest buildings in the state of New York, including the oldest houses and any other surviving structures. Some dates are approximate and based on architectural studies and historical records; other dates are based on dendrochronology. All entries should include citation with reference to: architectural features indicative of the date of construction; a report by an architectural historian; or dendrochronology.  Sites on the list are generally from the First Period of American architecture. Only houses built prior to 1725 are suitable for inclusion on this list, or the building must be the oldest of its type. If the exact year of initial construction is estimated, it will be shown as a range of dates.

Notes

External links
 International Architecture database
 Newsday.com article (accessed August 3, 2008)

New York
Oldest buildings